The 1997–98 NBA season was the Jazz's 24th season in the National Basketball Association, and 19th season in Salt Lake City, Utah. The Jazz entered the season as runner-ups in the 1997 NBA Finals, where they lost to the Chicago Bulls in six games. During the off-season, All-Star guard John Stockton sustained a knee injury and missed the first 18 games of the season, as the Jazz slowly got off to an 11–7 start after losing three of their first four games. The team also changed their starting lineup, replacing Bryon Russell at small forward with Adam Keefe, and replacing Greg Ostertag at center with Greg Foster. However, Stockton would eventually return as the Jazz held a 31–15 record at the All-Star break.

At midseason, the team traded Foster and Chris Morris to the Orlando Magic in exchange for Rony Seikaly in an effort to bolster the team's depth. However, Seikaly refused to report within the mandated 48 hours required by NBA rules. From there, the trade was called off, and the Jazz took Foster and Morris back. Rumors had it that Seikaly was out with a serious foot injury; however, Seikaly insisted the Jazz torpedoed the deal and that he wanted to play for them; however, Seikaly's refusal to report effectively killed the deal. After the trade was off, Orlando pivoted and traded Seikaly to the New Jersey Nets, where he would play a total of 18 games over the next 1 1/2 seasons before retiring from the NBA. The Jazz won 31 of their final 36 games after the All-Star break, including an 11-game winning streak between February and March, finishing first place in the Midwest Division with a 62–20 record. They made their fifteenth consecutive trip to the playoffs.

The Jazz's top scorer Karl Malone, who averaged 27.0 points and 10.3 rebounds per game, was part of a Jazz offense that had two other players, Stockton and Jeff Hornacek, averaging double-digits in points. Malone was the only member of the team to play in the 1998 NBA All-Star Game, while being named to the All-NBA First Team, and NBA All-Defensive First Team, and also finished in second place in Most Valuable Player voting behind Michael Jordan. In addition, Hornacek averaged 14.2 points and 1.4 steals per game, while Stockton provided the team with 12.0 points, 8.5 assists and 1.4 steals per game in 64 games, and Russell played a sixth man role, averaging 9.0 points per game off the bench. Second-year guard Shandon Anderson contributed 8.3 points per game off the bench, while Keefe averaged 7.8 points and 5.5 rebounds per game, and Howard Eisley provided with 7.7 points and 4.2 assists per game. On the defensive side, Foster averaged 5.7 points and 3.5 rebounds per game, and Ostertag contributed 5.9 rebounds, and led the team with 2.1 blocks per game. Hornacek also won the Three-Point Shootout during the All-Star Weekend in New York, and head coach Jerry Sloan finished in second place in Coach of the Year voting.

In the Western Conference First Round of the playoffs, the Jazz trailed 2–1 to the 8th-seeded Houston Rockets, but managed to win the series in five games. In the Western Conference Semi-finals, they defeated the San Antonio Spurs in five games. After that, the Jazz swept the Los Angeles Lakers in the Western Conference Finals in four straight games to advance to the NBA Finals for the second consecutive year, and once again, met the Chicago Bulls in a rematch of last year's NBA Finals, in which they lost to the Bulls in six games, just like last year's NBA Finals. Following the season, Antoine Carr signed as a free agent with the Houston Rockets, and Morris signed with the Phoenix Suns.

This was the last season the Jazz earned the top seed in the league and in the conference until the 2020–21 season.

Offseason

NBA Draft

The Jazz used two picks; a first round pick on point guard Jacque Vaughn and a second round pick on Nate Erdmann. Vaughn would play with the team for four seasons before going to the Atlanta Hawks and Erdmann was cut from the team right before regular season, therefore signing with Idaho Stampede in the CBA.

Roster

Roster Notes
 Rookie point guard Troy Hudson was waived on December 28.

Salaries

Regular season

Season standings

Record vs. opponents

Game log

|- align="center" bgcolor="#ffcccc"
| 1 || October 31 || @ L.A. Lakers || L 87–104 || Shandon Anderson (21) || Karl Malone (14) || Howard Eisley (6) || Great Western Forum16,234 || 0–1
|-

|- align="center" bgcolor="#ccffcc"
| 2 || November 1 || Denver || W 102–84 || Karl Malone (24) || Greg Ostertag (11) || Eisley, Hornacek (6) || Delta Center19,911 || 1–1
|- align="center" bgcolor="#ffcccc"
| 3 || November 3 || Washington || L 86–90 || Karl Malone (21) || Karl Malone (16) || Hornacek, Vaughn (6) || Delta Center19,911 || 1–2
|- align="center" bgcolor="#ffcccc"
| 4 || November 4 || @ Phoenix || L 84–106 || Karl Malone (22)  || Malone, Ostertag (11) || Jeff Hornacek (4) || America West Arena19,023 || 1–3
|- align="center" bgcolor="#ccffcc"
| 5 || November 7 || @ Denver || W 91–89 || Karl Malone (20) || Karl Malone (11) || Howard Eisley (6) || McNichols Sports Arena10,317 || 2–3
|- align="center" bgcolor="#ffcccc"
| 6 || November 8 || @ San Antonio || L 80–87 || Karl Malone (26) || Hornacek, Malone (7) || Howard Eisley (6) || Alamodome19,100 || 2–4 
|- align="center" bgcolor="#ccffcc"
| 7 || November 12 || Vancouver || W 98–90 || Karl Malone (26) || Keefe, Ostertag (9) || Howard Eisley (10) || Delta Center19,851 || 3–4
|- align="center" bgcolor="#ccffcc"
| 8 || November 14 || Seattle || W 110–104 || Hornacek, Malone (23) || Karl Malone (12) || Howard Eisley (6) || Delta Center19,830 || 4–4
|- align="center" bgcolor="#ccffcc"
| 9 || November 15 || @ Dallas || W 85–77 || Karl Malone (26) || Karl Malone (10) || Jeff Hornacek (10) || Reunion Arena14,323 || 5–4
|- align="center" bgcolor="#ffcccc"
| 10 || November 18 || L.A. Lakers || L 92–97 || Karl Malone (26) || Karl Malone (9) || Howard Eisley (7) || Delta Center19,911 || 5–5
|- align="center" bgcolor="#ffcccc"
| 11 || November 20 || @ Sacramento || L 95–97 || Karl Malone (32) || Karl Malone (9) || Howard Eisley (8) || ARCO Arena14,648 || 5–6
|- align="center" bgcolor="#ccffcc"
| 12 || November 22 || San Antonio || W 103–74 || Karl Malone (20) || Karl Malone (11) || Hornacek, Malone (7) || Delta Center19,911 || 6–6
|- align="center" bgcolor="#ccffcc"
| 13 || November 24 || Minnesota || W 133–124  (OT) || Karl Malone (33) || Foster, Malone (9) || Howard Eisley (10) || Delta Center19,911 || 7–6
|- align="center" bgcolor="#ccffcc"
| 14 || November 28 || Golden State || W 111–82 || Karl Malone (21) || Greg Ostertag (10) || Jacque Vaughn (8) || Delta Center19,911 || 8–6
|- align="center" bgcolor="#ccffcc"
| 15 || November 29 || @ L.A. Clippers || W 94–91 || Karl Malone (42) || Karl Malone (18) || Jeff Hornacek (7) || Los Angeles Memorial Sports Arena14,956 || 9–6
|-

|- align="center" bgcolor="#ccffcc"
| 16 || December 1 || New Jersey || W 100–95 || Karl Malone (19) || Karl Malone (14) || Howard Eisley (7) || Delta Center19,911 || 10–6
|-
|- align="center" bgcolor="#ccffcc"
| 17 || December 3 || Toronto || W 115–98 || Karl Malone (23) || Karl Malone (15) || Eisley, Hornacek (8) || Delta Center19,590 || 11–6
|-
|- align="center" bgcolor="#ffcccc"
| 18 || December 5 || @ Portland || L 77–94 || Karl Malone (24) || Karl Malone (12) || Jeff Hornacek (8) || Rose Garden Arena19,545 || 11–7
|-
|- align="center" bgcolor="#ccffcc"
| 19 || December 8 || Indiana || W 106–97 || Karl Malone (31) || Greg Ostertag (9) || John Stockton (7) || Delta Center19,911 || 12–7
|-
|- align="center" bgcolor="#ffcccc"
| 20 || December 9 || @ Sacramento || L 101–113 || Karl Malone (34) || Karl Malone (10) || John Stockton (5) || ARCO Arena13,624 || 12–8
|-
|- align="center" bgcolor="#ccffcc"
| 21 || December 12 || Dallas || W 68–66 || Karl Malone (23) || Adam Keefe (11) || Malone, Stockton (4) || Delta Center19,911 || 13–8
|-
|- align="center" bgcolor="#ffcccc"
| 22 || December 15 || @ Washington || L 86–88 || Karl Malone (26) || Karl Malone (13) || Eisley, Malone (6) || MCI Center18,756 || 13–9
|-
|- align="center" bgcolor="#ccffcc"
| 23 || December 16 || @ Miami || W 103–95 || Karl Malone (29) || Antoine Carr (7) || Howard Eisley (6) || Miami Arena15,200 || 14–9
|-
|- align="center" bgcolor="#ccffcc"
| 24 || December 18 || @ Orlando || W 85–73 || Karl Malone (30) || Greg Ostertag (10) || Malone, Stockton (5) || Orlando Arena17,258 || 15–9
|-
|- align="center" bgcolor="#ffcccc"
| 25 || December 21 || @ Cleveland || L 101–106 || Karl Malone (24) || Karl Malone (13) || Hornacek, Stockton (6) || Gund Arena19,178 || 15–10
|-
|- align="center" bgcolor="#ccffcc"
| 26 || December 22 || @ Atlanta || W 101–99 || Karl Malone (27) || Adam Keefe (10) || John Stockton (8) || Georgia Dome28,371 || 16–10
|-
|- align="center" bgcolor="#ccffcc"
| 27 || December 25 || Houston || W 107–103 || John Stockton (24) || Karl Malone (10) || Jeff Hornacek (9) || Delta Center19,911 || 17–10
|-
|- align="center" bgcolor="#ffcccc"
| 28 || December 27 || Portland || L 91–102 || Karl Malone (24) || Karl Malone (11) || John Stockton (9) || Delta Center19,911 || 17–11
|-
|- align="center" bgcolor="#ccffcc"
| 29 || December 28 || @ Vancouver || W 89–88 || Karl Malone (26) || Karl Malone (13) || John Stockton (7) || General Motors Place16,488 || 18–11
|-
|- align="center" bgcolor="#ccffcc"
| 30 || December 30 || @ Denver || W 132–99 || Greg Ostertag (21) || Karl Malone (10) || John Stockton (9) || McNichols Sports Arena14,230 || 19–11
|-

|- align="center" bgcolor="#ccffcc"
| 31 || January 3 || Atlanta || W 97–82 || Karl Malone (20) || Greg Ostertag (10) || John Stockton (12) || Delta Center19,911 || 20–11
|- align="center" bgcolor="#ccffcc"
| 32 || January 6 || Philadelphia || W 98–95 (OT) || Hornacek, Malone (21) || Greg Ostertag (9) || John Stockton (14) || Delta Center19,911 || 21–11
|- align="center" bgcolor="#ccffcc"
| 33 || January 8 || Milwaukee || W 116–109 || Karl Malone (39) || Greg Ostertag (10) || John Stockton (13) || Delta Center19,911 || 22–11
|- align="center" bgcolor="#ccffcc"
| 34 || January 10 || @ Houston || W 111–84 || Karl Malone (24) || Karl Malone (9) || Anderson, Eisley (7) || The Summit16,285 || 23–11
|- align="center" bgcolor="#ccffcc"
| 35 || January 12 || Cleveland || W 106–99 || Jeff Hornacek (23) || Karl Malone (11) || John Stockton (12) || Delta Center19,911 || 24–11
|- align="center" bgcolor="#ffcccc"
| 36 || January 16 || @ Portland || L 86–96 || Karl Malone (23) || Karl Malone (15) || John Stockton (6) || Rose Garden Arena21,538 || 24–12
|- align="center" bgcolor="#ccffcc"
| 37 || January 17 || Orlando || W 107–93 || Karl Malone (32) || Keefe, Malone (9) || John Stockton (10) || Delta Center19,911 || 25–12
|- align="center" bgcolor="#ccffcc"
| 38 || January 19 || Detroit || W 98–89 || Karl Malone (30) || Karl Malone (15) || John Stockton (13) || Delta Center19,911 || 26–12
|- align="center" bgcolor="#ccffcc"
| 39 || January 21 || Golden State || W 98–85 || Karl Malone (27) || Adam Keefe (8) || John Stockton (13) || Delta Center19,911 || 27–12
|- align="center" bgcolor="#ffcccc"
| 40 || January 23 || @ Indiana || L 102–106 || Karl Malone (26) || Greg Ostertag (11) || John Stockton (11) || Market Square Arena16,670 || 27–13
|- align="center" bgcolor="#ccffcc"
| 41 || January 25 || @ Chicago || W 101–94 || Karl Malone (35) || Karl Malone (11) || John Stockton (10) || United Center24,361 || 28–13
|- align="center" bgcolor="#ffcccc"
| 42 || January 28 || Seattle || L 93–101 || Karl Malone (27) || Karl Malone (15) || John Stockton (14) || Delta Center19,911 || 28–14
|- align="center" bgcolor="#ccffcc"
| 43 || January 30 || Dallas || W 104–94 || Karl Malone (29) || Greg Ostertag (12) || Eisley, Stockton (10) || Delta Center19,911 || 29–14
|-

|- align="center" bgcolor="#ccffcc"
| 44 || February 1 || @ Golden State || W 115–88 || Karl Malone (20) || Karl Malone (8) || Karl Malone (9) || The Arena In Oakland11,269 || 30–14
|- align="center" bgcolor="#ffcccc"
| 45 || February 3 || @ L.A. Clippers || L 102–111 || Karl Malone (23) || Karl Malone (7) || John Stockton (10) || Los Angeles Memorial Sports Arena13,553 || 30–15
|- align="center" bgcolor="#ccffcc"
| 46 || February 4 || Chicago || W 101–93 || Karl Malone (30) || Karl Malone (8) || John Stockton (18) || Delta Center19,911 || 31–15
|- align="center" bgcolor="#ccffcc"
| 47 || February 10 || L.A. Clippers || W 106–98 || Karl Malone (29) || Karl Malone (14) || John Stockton (10) || Delta Center19,911 || 32–15
|- align="center" bgcolor="#ccffcc"
| 48 || February 12 || Boston || W 118–100 || Karl Malone (31) || Karl Malone (12) || Howard Eisley (10) || Delta Center19,911 || 33–15
|- align="center" bgcolor="#ccffcc"
| 49 || February 14 || @ Seattle || W 111–91 || Karl Malone (34) || Karl Malone (8) || John Stockton (12) || KeyArena17,072 || 34–15
|- align="center" bgcolor="#ccffcc"
| 50 || February 16 || Charlotte || W 96–90 || Karl Malone (23) || Adam Keefe (12) || John Stockton (9) || Delta Center19,911 || 35–15
|- align="center" bgcolor="#ccffcc"
| 51 || February 18 || New York || W 94–78 || Karl Malone (25) || Adam Keefe (12) || Jeff Hornacek (6) || Delta Center19,911 || 36–15
|- align="center" bgcolor="#ccffcc"
| 52 || February 21 || @ San Antonio || W 79–77 || Karl Malone (24) || Karl Malone (13) || John Stockton (6) || Alamodome26,572 || 37–15
|- align="center" bgcolor="#ffcccc"
| 53 || February 24 || Miami || L 102–104 || Karl Malone (26) || Karl Malone (11) || John Stockton (10) || Delta Center19,911 || 37–16
|- align="center" bgcolor="#ccffcc"
| 54 || February 26 || Phoenix || W 108–97 || Karl Malone (28) || Karl Malone (17) || Howard Eisley (10) || Delta Center19,911 || 38–16
|-

|- align="center" bgcolor="#ccffcc"
| 55 || March 1 || @ Houston || W 106–100 || Karl Malone (21) || Karl Malone (9) || John Stockton (14) || The Summit16,285 || 39–16
|- align="center" bgcolor="#ccffcc"
| 56 || March 3 || @ Toronto || W 108–93 || Shandon Anderson (26) || Karl Malone (10) || John Stockton (11) || SkyDome16,448 || 40–16
|- align="center" bgcolor="#ccffcc"
| 57 || March 4 || @ Boston || W 110–94 || Karl Malone (32) || Karl Malone (15) || John Stockton (9) || FleetCenter18,624 || 41–16
|- align="center" bgcolor="#ccffcc"
| 58 || March 6 || @ New Jersey || W 122–115 || Karl Malone (32) || Karl Malone (12) || John Stockton (9) || Continental Airlines Arena20,049 || 42–16
|- align="center" bgcolor="#ccffcc"
| 59 || March 7 || @ Milwaukee || W 110–92 || Karl Malone (40) || Karl Malone (8) || John Stockton (7) || Bradley Center18,717 || 43–16
|- align="center" bgcolor="#ccffcc"
| 60 || March 9 || Houston || W 100–93 || Karl Malone (29) || Karl Malone (21) || Karl Malone (6) || Delta Center19,911 || 44–16
|- align="center" bgcolor="#ccffcc"
| 61 || March 11 || Sacramento || W 110–95 || Karl Malone (25) || Karl Malone (9) || Karl Malone (9) || Delta Center19,911 || 45–16
|- align="center" bgcolor="#ccffcc"
| 62 || March 13 || Vancouver || W 110–101 || Karl Malone (30) || Adam Keefe (11) || John Stockton (11) || Delta Center19,911 || 46–16
|- align="center" bgcolor="#ccffcc"
| 63 || March 15 || @ Detroit || W 109–98 || Karl Malone (28) || Karl Malone (9) || Eisley, Stockton (7) || The Palace of Auburn Hills22,076 || 47–16
|- align="center" bgcolor="#ccffcc"
| 64 || March 16 || @ Minnesota || W 102–96 || Karl Malone (29) || Greg Foster (10) || three players tied (8) || Target Center17,333 || 48–16
|- align="center" bgcolor="#ffcccc"
| 65 || March 18 || @ Charlotte || L 85–111 || Karl Malone (17) || Malone, Russell (9) || John Stockton (7) || Charlotte Coliseum23,305 || 48–17
|- align="center" bgcolor="#ccffcc"
| 66 || March 20 || @ Philadelphia || W 91–79 || Karl Malone (23) || Karl Malone (16) || Howard Eisley (7) || CoreStates Center20,832 || 49–17
|- align="center" bgcolor="#ccffcc"
| 67 || March 22 || @ New York || W 124–119 (2OT) || Karl Malone (30) || Karl Malone (14) || John Stockton (14) || Madison Square Garden19,763 || 50–17
|- align="center" bgcolor="#ccffcc"
| 68 || March 24 || Phoenix || W 92–73 || Karl Malone (19) || Greg Foster (15) || John Stockton (11) || Delta Center19,911 || 51–17
|- align="center" bgcolor="#ccffcc"
| 69 || March 27 || @ Dallas || W 99–90 || Karl Malone (33) || Karl Malone (14) || Jeff Hornacek (8) || Reunion Arena13,763 || 52–17
|- align="center" bgcolor="#ccffcc"
| 70 || March 28 || L.A. Lakers || W 106–91 || Karl Malone (31) || Keefe, Malone (8) || John Stockton (9) || Delta Center19,911 || 53–17
|- align="center" bgcolor="#ffcccc"
| 71 || March 31 || @ Seattle || L 86–88 || Karl Malone (20) || Karl Malone (10) || Jeff Hornacek (7) || KeyArena17,072 || 53–18
|-

|- align="center" bgcolor="#ccffcc"
| 72 || April 1 || Portland || W 98–89 || Jeff Hornacek (31) || Greg Ostertag (9) || John Stockton (9) || Delta Center19,911 || 54–18
|- align="center" bgcolor="#ccffcc"
| 73 || April 3 || Denver || W 97–75 || Karl Malone (22) || Greg Ostertag (8) || Howard Eisley (9) || Delta Center19,911 || 55–18
|- align="center" bgcolor="#ccffcc"
| 74 || April 5 || @ Vancouver || W 99–93 || Karl Malone (25) || Greg Ostertag (9) || John Stockton (8) || General Motors Place18,068 || 56–18
|- align="center" bgcolor="#ccffcc"
| 75 || April 7 || @ Golden State || W 101–99 || Karl Malone (56) || Foster, Malone (9) || John Stockton (14) || The Arena In Oakland14,430 || 57–18
|- align="center" bgcolor="#ccffcc"
| 76 || April 8 || San Antonio || W 98–88 || Karl Malone (32) || Karl Malone (10) || John Stockton (9) || Delta Center19,911 || 58–18
|- align="center" bgcolor="#ccffcc"
| 77 || April 10 || L.A. Clippers || W 126–109 || Jeff Hornacek (23) || Greg Foster (10) || Jeff Hornacek (6) || Delta Center19,911 || 59–18
|- align="center" bgcolor="#ffcccc"
| 78 || April 11 || @ Minnesota || L 103–110 || Karl Malone (37) || Karl Malone (12) || Jeff Hornacek (8) || Target Center20,051 || 59–19
|- align="center" bgcolor="#ccffcc"
| 79 || April 14 || Minnesota || W 126–109 || Karl Malone (44) || Karl Malone (14) || Malone, Stockton (6) || Delta Center19,911 || 60–19
|- align="center" bgcolor="#ccffcc"
| 80 || April 16 || Sacramento || W 99–86 || Karl Malone (21) || Karl Malone (8) || Jeff Hornacek (11) || Delta Center19,911 || 61–19
|- align="center" bgcolor="#ccffcc"
| 81 || April 17 || @ Phoenix || W 102–99 || Karl Malone (29) || Karl Malone (9) || Howard Eisley (10) || America West Arena19,023 || 62–19
|- align="center" bgcolor="#ffcccc"
| 82 || April 19 || @ L.A. Lakers || L 98–102 || Karl Malone (27) || Karl Malone (9) || Howard Eisley (4) || Great Western Forum17,505 || 62–20
|-

Playoffs

|- align="center" bgcolor="#ffcccc"
| 1
| April 23
| Houston
| L 90–103
| Karl Malone (25)
| Karl Malone (11)
| John Stockton (8)
| Delta Center19,911
| 0–1
|- align="center" bgcolor="#ccffcc"
| 2
| April 25
| Houston
| W 105–90
| Karl Malone (29)
| Greg Ostertag (11)
| John Stockton (10)
| Delta Center19,911
| 1–1
|- align="center" bgcolor="#ffcccc"
| 3
| April 29
| @ Houston
| L 85–89
| Malone, Russell (19)
| Karl Malone (14)
| Stockton, Eisley (6)
| Compaq Center16,285
| 1–2
|- align="center" bgcolor="#ccffcc"
| 4
| May 1
| @ Houston
| W 93–71
| Karl Malone (29)
| Karl Malone (13)
| John Stockton (7)
| Compaq Center16,285
| 2–2
|- align="center" bgcolor="#ccffcc"
| 5
| May 3
| Houston
| W 84–70
| Karl Malone (31)
| Karl Malone (15)
| John Stockton (10)
| Delta Center19,911
| 3–2
|-

|- align="center" bgcolor="#ccffcc"
| 1
| May 5
| San Antonio
| W 83–82
| Karl Malone (25)
| Karl Malone (8)
| John Stockton (8)
| Delta Center19,911
| 1–0
|- align="center" bgcolor="#ccffcc"
| 2
| May 7
| San Antonio
| W 109–106
| Karl Malone (22)
| Karl Malone (12)
| John Stockton (12)
| Delta Center19,911
| 2–0
|- align="center" bgcolor="#ffcccc"
| 3
| May 9
| @ San Antonio
| L 64–86
| Karl Malone (18)
| Greg Ostertag (9)
| Hornacek, Vaughn (3)
| Alamodome26,086
| 2–1
|- align="center" bgcolor="#ccffcc"
| 4
| May 10
| @ San Antonio
| W 82–73
| Karl Malone (34)
| Karl Malone (12)
| John Stockton (7)
| Alamodome28,587
| 3–1
|- align="center" bgcolor="#ccffcc"
| 5
| May 12
| San Antonio
| W 87–77
| Karl Malone (24)
| Karl Malone (13)
| Howard Eisley (7)
| Delta Center19,911
| 4–1
|-

|- align="center" bgcolor="#ccffcc"
| 1
| May 16
| L.A. Lakers
| W 112–77
| Karl Malone (29)
| Shandon Anderson (11)
| Stockton, Eisley (9)
| Delta Center19,911
| 1–0
|- align="center" bgcolor="#ccffcc"
| 2
| May 18
| L.A. Lakers
| W 99–95
| Karl Malone (33)
| Malone, Russell (7)
| John Stockton (6)
| Delta Center19,911
| 2–0
|- align="center" bgcolor="#ccffcc"
| 3
| May 22
| @ L.A. Lakers
| W 109–98
| Karl Malone (26)
| Karl Malone (10)
| John Stockton (8)
| Great Western Forum17,505
| 3–0
|- align="center" bgcolor="#ccffcc"
| 4
| May 24
| @ L.A. Lakers
| W 96–92
| Karl Malone (32)
| Karl Malone (14)
| John Stockton (8)
| Great Western Forum17,505
| 4–0
|-

|- align="center" bgcolor="#ccffcc"
| 1
| June 3
| Chicago
| W 88–85 (OT)
| John Stockton (24)
| Karl Malone (14)
| John Stockton (8)
| Delta Center19,911
| 1–0
|- align="center" bgcolor="#ffcccc"
| 2
| June 5
| Chicago
| L 88–93
| Jeff Hornacek (20)
| Karl Malone (12)
| Eisley, Stockton (7)
| Delta Center19,911
| 1–1
|- align="center" bgcolor="#ffcccc"
| 3
| June 7
| @ Chicago
| L 54–96
| Karl Malone (22)
| Greg Ostertag (9)
| John Stockton (7)
| United Center23,844
| 1–2
|- align="center" bgcolor="#ffcccc"
| 4
| June 10
| @ Chicago
| L 82–86
| Karl Malone (21)
| Karl Malone (14)
| John Stockton (13)
| United Center23,844
| 1–3
|- align="center" bgcolor="#ccffcc"
| 5
| June 12
| @ Chicago
| W 83–81
| Karl Malone (39)
| Karl Malone (9)
| John Stockton (12)
| United Center23,844
| 2–3
|- align="center" bgcolor="#ffcccc"
| 6
| June 14
| Chicago
| L 86–87
| Karl Malone (31)
| Karl Malone (11)
| Karl Malone (7)
| Delta Center19,911
| 2–4
|-

Player statistics

Season

Playoffs

Awards and records
 Karl Malone, All-NBA First Team
 Karl Malone, NBA All-Defensive First Team
 Karl Malone, NBA Leader, Free Throw Attempts (825)

Transactions

Trades

Free agents

Additions

Subtractions

See also
 1997–98 NBA season

References

Utah Jazz seasons
Western Conference (NBA) championship seasons
Utah
Utah
Utah